Prime Time Football '96 is a video game developed by Sega Sports and published by Sega for the Sega Genesis. A Sega Saturn version was also planned but cancelled.

Gameplay
Prime Time Football '96 is a sequel to NFL '95 starring Deion Sanders. All of the league's 30 teams (including the two new expansion teams, the Carolina Panthers and Jacksonville Jaguars) plus all of the league's players and attributes reflect the 1995 season.

Reception
Next Generation reviewed the Genesis version of the game, rating it four stars out of five, and stated that "There is noting really wrong with Prime Time other than the fact that it isn't much better than last year's version."

Reviews
GamePro (Nov, 1995)
Electronic Gaming Monthly (Nov, 1995)
All Game Guide - 1998
Electric Playground (Nov 06, 1995)

References

1995 video games
American football video games
Sega video games
Sega Genesis games
Sega Genesis-only games
Video games developed in the United States
Video games scored by Andy Armer